L40 may refer to:
 IBM PS/2 L40 SX, a portable computer
 , a destroyer of the Royal Navy
 Mitochondrial ribosomal protein L40
 New Flyer L40, a Canadian bus
 Orličan L-40 Meta Sokol, a Czechoslovakian sports and touring aircraft
 Pentax Optio L40, a digital camera
 Toyota Paseo (L40), a subcompact car
 Toyota Tercel (L40), a subcompact car